The viviparous brotulas form a family, the Bythitidae, of ophidiiform fishes. They are known as viviparous brotulas as they generally bear live young, although there are indications that some species (at least Didymothallus criniceps) do not.

Although many live near the coast in tropical or subtropical oceans, there are also species in deep water and cold oceans, for example Bythites. A few are fresh or brackish water cavefish: the Mexican blind brotula (Typhliasina pearsei), Galapagos cuskeel (Ogilbia galapagosensis), Diancistrus typhlops and some Lucifuga species.

Since 2002, more than 110 new species have been added to this family.
In 2005, 26 new species were described in a single paper by Danish and German scientists and in 2007, an additional eight new genera with 20 new species were described in another paper by the same scientists.

In some classifications the family Aphyonidae is placed within the Bythitidae and the tribe Dinematichthyini of the subfamily Brosmophycinae has been raised to the status of a family, the Dinematichthyidae which contains 25 genera and 114 species.

The Bythitidae is divided as follows:

Subfamily Brosmophycinae
 Tribe Dinematichthyini
 Alionematichthys
 Beaglichthys
 Brosmolus
 Brotulinella
 Dactylosurculus
 Dermatopsis
 Dermatopsoides
 Diancistrus
 Didymothallus
 Dinematichthys
 Dipulus
 Gunterichthys
 Lapitaichthys
 Majungaichthys
 Mascarenichthys
 Monothrix
 Nielsenichthys
 Ogilbia
 Ogilbichthys
 Paradiancistrus
 Porocephalichthys
 Typhliasina
 Ungusurculus
 Zephyrichthys
 Tribe Brosmophycini
 Bidenichthys
 Brosmodorsalis
 Brosmophyciops
 Brosmophycis
 Eusurculus
 Fiordichthys
 Lucifuga
 Melodichthys
 Subfamily Bythitinae
 Acarobythites
 Anacanthobythites
 Bellottia
 Bythites
 Calamopteryx
 Cataetyx
 Diplacanthopoma
 Ematops
 Grammonus
 Hastatobythites
 Hephthocara
 Microbrotula
 Parasaccogaster
 Pseudogilbia
 Pseudonus
 Saccogaster
 Stygnobrotula
 Thalassobathia
 Thermichthys
 Timorichthys
 Tuamotuichthys

References 

 

Bythitidae
Viviparous fish